The Twin City Model Railroad Museum is a railroad museum in Saint Paul, Minnesota, United States, which has a large display of model railroads. The museum has had a home in Saint Paul since 1934, where it first started as a club. In later years the museum established a home in the Saint Paul Union Depot, and later in Bandana Square. On October 16, 2015, the museum announced that it was looking for a new home. The museum subsequently announced it would be moving to a new location in spring of 2016. The museum reopened on May 17, 2016, in their new location at 668 Transfer Road, Suite 8. The new location is just south of the former Amtrak Midway Depot along the Minnesota Commercial railyard.

References 

 The Twin City Model Railroad Club/Museum 1934–2009, compiled by Ray Barton, Michael Mackner and Robert Neiderkorn.

External links
 Twin City Model Railroad Museum

1934 establishments in Minnesota
Museums in Saint Paul, Minnesota
Railroad museums in Minnesota
Rail transport modelling